The women's 150m individual medley SM4 event at the 2008 Summer Paralympics took place at the Beijing National Aquatics Center on 14 September. There were no heats in this event.

Final

Competed at 17:43.

WR = World Record. DQ = Disqualified.

References
 
 

Swimming at the 2008 Summer Paralympics
2008 in women's swimming